TMEP may refer to:

 Trademark Manual of Examining Procedure
 Telangiectasia macularis eruptiva perstans
Tu Madre es Puta